Peter Holland (born 5 May 1958) is a New Zealand cricketer. He played in 39 first-class and 15 List A matches for Central Districts, Northern Districts and Wellington from 1976 to 1984.

References

External links
 

1958 births
Living people
New Zealand cricketers
Central Districts cricketers
Northern Districts cricketers
Wellington cricketers
Cricketers from Nelson, New Zealand